The 1991–92 La Salle Explorers men's basketball team represented La Salle University during the 1991–92 NCAA Division I men's basketball season. Led by sixth-year head coach Speedy Morris, the team finished second in the conference regular season standings. The Explorers won the MAAC tournament to gain an automatic bid to the NCAA tournament as the No. 13 seed in the East region. La Salle would lose in the opening round to Seton Hall, a game they led by as many as 8 points, 78–76.

Roster

Schedule and results

|-
!colspan=12 style=| Regular season

|-
!colspan=12 style=| MAAC Tournament

|-
!colspan=12 style=| NCAA Tournament

Sources

Awards and honors
 Randy Woods, MAAC Player of the Year

Team players drafted into the NBA

References

La Salle Explorers men's basketball seasons
La Salle Explorers
La Salle
La
La